Spencer Brook is a river in Delaware County, New York. It flows into Chase Brook east of Rock Rift.

References

Rivers of New York (state)
Rivers of Delaware County, New York